Horowitz is a Levitical Ashkenazi surname deriving from the Horowitz family, though it can also be a non-Jewish surname as well. The name is derived from the town of Hořovice, Bohemia. Other variants of the name include Harowitz, Harrwitz, Harwitz, Horovitz, Horvitz, Horwicz, Horwitz, Hourwitz, Hurewicz, Hurwicz, Hurwitz, Gerovich, Gurovich, Gurevich, Gurvich, Gourevitch, Orowitz and Urwitz.

List of people with the surname Horowitz

Rabbis
Aaron HaLevi ben Moses of Staroselye
Isaiah Horowitz, Prague-born rabbi of Germany, Austria, Prague and Palestine, Kabbalist, and author, 1555–1630
Levi Yitzchak Horowitz, Bostoner rabbi, 1921–2009
Mayer Alter Horowitz (born 1946), Bostoner rabbi in Har Nof
Moses ha-Levi Hurwitz (d. 1820), Lithuanian rabbi
Moshe Meshullam Halevy Horowitz (1832–1894), Galician rabbi
Naftali Yehuda Horowitz, Bostoner rabbi of Boston
Pinchas Horowitz (c.1731–1805), German rabbi and Talmudist
Pinchas David Horowitz (1877–1931), First Bostoner rabbi, 1876–1941
Shabbethai Horowitz (1590–1660), Volhynia-born Austrian rabbi and Talmudist, son of Isaiah Horowitz.
Shabtai Sheftel Horowitz (1565–1619), rabbi and nephew of Isaiah Horowitz
Shmelke of Nikolsburg (1726–1778), Galician-born Landesrabbiner of Moravia and kabbalist
Shmuel Horowitz (1903–1973), compiler and publisher of Breslov books
Yidele Horowitz (1905–1989), Hasidic rebbe of Dzikov
Yosef Yoizel Hurwitz (1847-1919), Belorussian rosh yeshiva, Alter of Novardok

Other people
Adam Horowitz (journalist), co-editor of Mondoweiss
Adam Horowitz (born 1971), American TV show writer
Alexandre Horowitz (1904–1982), Dutch technical engineer and inventor
Andrew Horowitz (born 1983), American songwriter, producer and member of the band Tally Hall
Anthony Horowitz (born 1955), British author and television scriptwriter
Ariel Horowitz (born 1970), Israeli singer-songwriter
Barry Horowitz (born 1959), American wrestler
Ben Horowitz (born 1966), technology entrepreneur and investor
Bernhard Horwitz (born 1807), German and British chess master, one of the Berlin Pleiades
Curly Howard (1903–1952), American comedian, birth name Jerome Horwitz
Daniel Horowitz (born 1954), legal analyst and attorney
David Horowitz (born 1939), writer and social activist
David Horowitz (author) (1903–2002), founder of the United Israel World Union
David Horowitz (consumer advocate) (1937–2019), American consumer advocate
David Horowitz (economist) (1899–1979), first governor of the Bank of Israel
Donald Horowitz (New Jersey lawyer) (born 1936), American lawyer
Donald L. Horowitz (born 1939), American professor of law and political science
Eugene Maurice Orowitz (1936–1991), American actor, better known by stage name Michael Landon
Harry Horowitz (1889–1914), American underworld figure and a leader of the Lenox Avenue Gang in New York City
Helen Lefkowitz Horowitz (born 1942), professor emerita of American studies and history at Smith College
Isaac Horowitz (1920–2005), scientist in automatic control theory, developed quantitative feedback theory
Israel Albert Horowitz (1907–1973), American chess master
Jerome Horwitz (1919–2012), American scientist
Jordan Horowitz (born 1980), American film producer
Joseph Horowitz (born 1948), American musicologist and cultural historian
Leah Horowitz (born 1933), Israeli hurdler
Michael C. Horowitz (born 1978), American writer and political scientist
Michael D. Horowitz, American author
Michael E. Horowitz, American lawyer and Inspector General of the US Department of Justice
Michael J. Horowitz (born 1964), American electrical engineer
Moses Horowitz (1844–1910), Yiddish playwright
Moe Howard (1897–1975), American comedian, birth name Moses Harry Horwitz
Nitzan Horowitz (born 1965), Israeli journalist and politician
Norman Horowitz (1915–2005), American geneticist and space biologist
Paul Horowitz (born 1942), American physicist and electrical engineer
Ryszard Horowitz (born 1930), Polish photographer
Scott J. Horowitz (born 1957), American astronaut
Shemp Howard (1895–1955), American actor, birth name Samuel Horwitz
Shmuel Hurwitz (1901–1999), Israeli agronomist
 Slawa Horowitz Duldig (1901–1975), Austrian-Australian inventor, artist, interior designer and teacher
Tamara Horowitz (1950–2000), American philosopher
Vladimir Horowitz (1903–1989), American classical pianist
Wayne Horowitz, archeologist
Winona Ryder (born 1971), American actress, birth name Winona Horowitz

Other
 S. Horowitz & Co., Israeli law firm

See also 
 Horovitz
 Horvitz
 Gurvich

References 

Jewish surnames
Yiddish-language surnames
Levite surnames